David Nixon (born 9 July 1988 in Paisley, Scotland) is a Scottish defender footballer for Airdrie United.

Nixon began his career with Motherwell, progressing through their youth system. In October 2007, Nixon joined Queen of the South on a three-month loan and returned to Fir Park in January 2008.

Nixon joined Airdrie United in July 2008.

Nixon was part of the Airdrie United side who put Hearts out of the CIS Insurance Cup in 2008. After a stunning performance he won the 'Man Of The Match' award.

Honours
Airdrie United
Scottish Challenge Cup: 2008–09

References

http://news.bbc.co.uk/sport2/hi/football/scot_cups/7632481.stm

External links

1988 births
Living people
Motherwell F.C. players
Queen of the South F.C. players
Airdrieonians F.C. players
Scottish Football League players
Scottish footballers
Association football defenders